Linear aeration is an aeration process that allows water to penetrate the soil and to be retained in the proper amounts. Linear aeration also adds organic nutrition, soil softeners (humus, topsoil, compost, sand, clay, etc.) if necessary.

Gardens
In linear aeration, the necessary organic matter is added on top of the soil surface, between plantings. The grooves are then cut into the soil to let the amendments and additives enter the soil. The grooves are then recovered in the same passage.

Lawns
Linear aeration also alleviates excessive water in lawn areas. In linear aeration, the necessary organic matter is added on top of the turf. Next, grooves are cut into the turf to let the soil additives enter the soil; the grooves are recovered in the same passage.

Benefits of linear aeration

Gardens
Promotes stronger and deeper root development, for plant health and drought tolerance;
Permits proper distribution of soil amendments and additives;
Allows organic nutrition absorption.

Lawns
Alleviates soil compaction in heavily traveled areas;
Provides smoother lawn surfaces;
Drastically reduces disruption of actual turf surface compared to coring or plugs aeration;
Causes minimal interruption of use of athletic fields.

See also

Soil improvers index

References

Soil
Soil improvers
Horticultural techniques
Lawn care